Elubo is a town in the Jomoro district, a district in the Western Region of Ghana.

Location and geography

Location
Elubo is a town in the western region of Ghana almost on the border with Ivory Coast. Elubo lies some distance from the Western region's coast.

Geography
Elubo is part of the Western Region. One of the major financial institutions in the town is First Allied Savings and Loans Limited.

References

Villages in Ghana
Populated places in Jomoro Municipal District